Christian Ho (born 31 October 2006) is a Singaporean-Korean racing driver who is set to compete in the 2023 F4 Spanish Championship with Campos Racing. He last competed for MP Motorsport in the 2022 F4 Spanish Championship He is currently managed by Nicolas Todt, son of former FIA president Jean Todt. He was a member of the Sauber Karting Team from 2019 to 2021.

Career

Karting 
In 2017 and 2018, he competed in his first WSK events in the 60 Mini category. After a year in OK Junior karts, he was the vice-champion in the 2019 German Junior Kart Championship with Ricky Flynn Motorsport. He became runner-up to Kajus Siksnelis during the 2019 Karting Academy Trophy. During that year he also took part in the 2019 Karting World Championship, in which he ranked 11th. In 2020, he finished third in the WSK Champions Cup in the OK Junior category. He also took third place in the IAME Asia Cup, in the senior category.

In September 2021, Ho became the latest signing to Nicolas Todt’s All Road Management stable.

Formula 4

Formula 4 UAE 
Ho made his single-seater debut in the 2022 Formula 4 UAE Championship with MP Motorsport during the third weekend of the series, in preparation for his upcoming main campaign. He finished tenth in his first race and two races later, in fifth. Two more tenth places saw him place 21st in the standings.

Spanish Formula 4

2022 
Ho continued with MP Motorsport for the 2022 F4 Spanish Championship. In the first race, he scored a point in tenth place. His results improved towards the end of the season, scoring two fourth places and a fifth place. Ho ended the championship in 13th place with 50 points.

2023 
Ho remained in Spanish F4 for 2023, but switched to Campos Racing.

Karting record

Karting career summary

Racing record

Racing career summary 

* Season still in progress.

Complete Formula 4 UAE Championship results 
(key) (Races in bold indicate pole position) (Races in italics indicate fastest lap)

Complete F4 Spanish Championship results 
(key) (Races in bold indicate pole position) (Races in italics indicate fastest lap)

References

External links 
 
 

Living people
2006 births

Singaporean racing drivers
Karting World Championship drivers
Spanish F4 Championship drivers
MP Motorsport drivers
UAE F4 Championship drivers
Sauber Motorsport drivers
Campos Racing drivers